This article list the results of men's singles category in the 2009 All England Super Series.

Seeds
 Lee Chong Wei
 Lin Dan     
 Chen Jin
 Peter Gade
 Sony Dwi Kuncoro
 Joachim Persson
 Taufik Hidayat
 Przemysław Wacha

Draws

Finals

Top Half

Bottom Half

Sources
 Yonex All England Open Super Series 2009 - Men's singles

- Mens Singles, 2009 All England Super Series